The imperial election of 1690 was an imperial election held to select the emperor of the Holy Roman Empire.  It took place in Augsburg on January 23.

Background 
On May 26, 1685, Charles II, Elector Palatine, the Calvinist elector of the Electoral Palatinate, died without children.  He was succeeded by his Catholic cousin Philip William, Elector Palatine, bringing the balance of electors to six Catholics, one Calvinist, and one Lutheran.

The Holy Roman Empire had been embroiled since 1683 in the Great Turkish War, repelling attempted Ottoman conquests in Southeast Europe.  On September 25, 1688, hoping to capitalize on the empire's preoccupation with the Turks, the French king Louis XIV of France invaded across the Rhine, precipitating the Nine Years' War.  Louis's war aims were to install his preferred candidate, Wilhelm Egon von Fürstenberg, bishop of Strasbourg, as elector of Cologne, and to occupy the Electoral Palatinate, to which he believed he was entitled as Charles II's sister Elizabeth Charlotte, Madame Palatine was the wife of his younger brother Philippe I, Duke of Orléans.

Leopold I, Holy Roman Emperor called for the election of his successor.  He was granted one vote as king of Bohemia, but because the even number of electors might result in a tie, following the precedent of the elections of 1653 and 1658, he abstained.  The remaining seven electors were:

 Anselm Franz von Ingelheim, elector of Mainz
 Johann Hugo von Orsbeck, elector of Trier
 Joseph Clemens of Bavaria, elector of Cologne
 Maximilian II Emanuel, Elector of Bavaria, elector of Bavaria
 John George III, Elector of Saxony, elector of Saxony
 Frederick I of Prussia, elector of Brandenburg
 Philip William, Elector Palatine, elector of the Electoral Palatinate

Elected 
Joseph I, Holy Roman Emperor, Leopold's eldest son, was elected.

Aftermath 
Joseph acceded to the throne on his father's death on May 5, 1705.

1690
1690 in the Holy Roman Empire
17th-century elections in Europe
1690 in politics
Non-partisan elections
Joseph I, Holy Roman Emperor
Frederick I of Prussia